Fort Carney was a stockade fort built in 1813 in present-day Clarke County, Alabama during the Creek War (part of the larger War of 1812).

History

Creek War
After Red Stick warriors began attacking settlers in the area, many families joined together to create protective stockades. Josiah Carney, who moved to Clarke County in 1809 from North Carolina, began building a stockade in 1813 at Carney's Bluff. Carney's Bluff was later known as Gullett's Bluff. Fort Carney was also known as Fort Hawn or Fort Gullett. The fort site was located six miles south of Jackson on the road from Jackson to Mount Vernon.

Sources differ on the number of occupants of Fort Carney. Albert J. Pickett reported 390 individuals occupied Fort Carney, while Timothy H. Ball stated that it only contained "a few occupants".

Sixty members of the 8th Regiment Mississippi Militia occupied Fort Carney.

Prior to the Fort Mims massacre, it was reported that Red Stick warriors examined Fort Carney but decided to attack Fort Mims instead.

Fort Powell was a stockade fort located three miles south of Fort Carney at Oven Bluff. After the Fort Mims massacre, settlers from Fort Powell moved to Fort Carney before moving to Mount Vernon.

Jeremiah Austill, who gained fame for his participation in the Canoe Fight, stopped at Fort Carney on his ride from Fort Madison to Fort Stoddert. Austill volunteered for the seventy-five mile ride to request additional protection for the occupants of Fort Madison.

American Civil War
During the Civil War, a Confederate fort named Fort Gullett was built on the site of Fort Carney. Fort Gullett was built in 1862 to protect the nearby salt wells. Fort Gullett also served to prevent Federal gunboats from traveling up the Tombigbee River. The fort was abandoned in the later years of the Civil War.

References

Sources
 
 
 
 
 
 
 

Pre-statehood history of Alabama
Buildings and structures in Clarke County, Alabama
Carney
Carney
American Civil War forts
Alabama in the American Civil War
Creek War